Born on a Pirate Ship is the third full-length studio album by Barenaked Ladies (BNL), featuring the songs "Shoe Box", "The Old Apartment", "When I Fall" and "Break Your Heart". "The Old Apartment" would become BNL's first US hit in 1997.

Born on a Pirate Ship was recorded as a four-piece quartet, following the departure of keyboardist Andy Creeggan. Kevin Hearn is not credited on the album, but joined the group for the 1995 tour preceding the album's release in time to be thanked in the liner notes for "injecting new spirit."

Steven Page and Ed Robertson returned to writing together, as they did upon the band's formation, but had abandoned following the release of Gordon.

The album is also an enhanced CD. The data track contains audio samples from the band's previous two CDs, a short montage of press photos, several of the band's music videos, a short trivia quiz, and a pair of "behind the scenes" videos from the band. Similar content was included and expanded upon on the Shoe Box E.P.; however, the format of the enhanced CD used in the creation of that CD renders the data track inaccessible on modern operating systems.

Although a moderate hit in Canada reaching No. 12, the album managed No. 111 in the US. Born on a Pirate Ship was awarded gold status in the U.S. in 2000.

The title and front cover photo refers to a vulgar joke that was popular around the time the band members were children. One kid would instruct another to pull back the corners of their mouth with their fingers (but not stick their tongue out) and say, "I was born on a pirate ship."  The result would sound like them saying, "I was born on a pile o' shit."  Sometimes "with a bunch of apples" would be added at the end, which would come out as "with a bunch of assholes."

Track listing

Personnel
Barenaked Ladies
 Jim Creeggan – vocals, double bass, acoustic guitar, electric guitar, dobro, fiddle, piano, electric double bass, percussion, yells
 Steven Page – vocals, sound effects, electric guitar, percussion, yells
 Ed Robertson – vocals, acoustic guitar, electric guitar, pedal steel guitar, bass guitar, cowbell, sound effects, yells
 Tyler Stewart – drums, piano, vibraphone, percussion, shaker, Fisher-Price xylophone, tambourine, background vocals, yells

Additional personnel
 Bryan Adams – yells
 Chris Brown – organ
 Mark Fewer – violin
 Gene Hardy – tenor saxophone, saw
 Hugh Marsh – fiddle
 Murray McLauchlan – harmonica
 Michael Phillip Wojewoda – background vocals, tambourine, sound effects, yells
 Tony Rapoport – viola
 Tim Walsh – trombone
 Stoney Park Pow-Wow Singers – singing and drumming
 Robert Tilton – sample saying "and you have faith! You just need to use it, saith the Lord" on "I Know"

Production
 Producers: Barenaked Ladies, Michael Phillip Wojewoda
 Engineer: Michael Phillip Wojewoda
 Assistant engineers: Jeff Elliott, Tom Heron, Dale Morningstar
 Mixing: Michael Phillip Wojewoda
 Piano preparation: Robin Billinton, Steven Page

Singles

Charts
Album

Singles

References

Barenaked Ladies albums
1996 albums
Reprise Records albums
Albums produced by Michael Phillip Wojewoda